Ingrid Jonach (born 6 May 1983) is a children's and young adult author who lives in Canberra, the national capital of Australia. She graduated from the University of Canberra with a Bachelor of Arts in Professional Writing (Hon). She has worked as a journalist and in public relations. Her books include children's picture book A Lot of Things and children's novels The Frank Frankie and Frankie goes to France, which are about a young girl who starts her own newspaper.
 
Her début young adult novel When the World was Flat (and we were in love) was published by global science fiction and fantasy imprint Strange Chemistry on 3 September 2013 in the US and Canada and 5 September 2013 in the UK and rest of world.

Works
When the World Was Flat (and we were in love). (Strange Chemistry, 2013)  
Frankie goes to France. (Pan Macmillan, 2008) 
The Frank Frankie. (Pan Macmillan, 2007) 
A Lot of Things. (here publications, 2005)

References

Further reading
 Official website
 Good Reading Magazine review
 When the World Was Flat (and we were in love) Goodreads Page

Australian children's writers
Living people
1983 births
People educated at St Peter's Catholic College, Tuggerah